Amt Brüssow (Uckermark) is an Amt ("collective municipality") in the district of Uckermark, in Brandenburg, Germany. Its seat is in Brüssow.

The Amt Brüssow (Uckermark) consists of the following municipalities:
Brüssow
Carmzow-Wallmow
Göritz
Schenkenberg
Schönfeld

Demography

References 

Brussow
Uckermark (district)